Holly Grove Mansion, also known as Holly Grove Inn or Ruffner Mansion, is a historic home located at Charleston, West Virginia on the grounds of the West Virginia State Capitol.  It is a large brick house with a front section made to accommodate three floors and rear section housing two.  It features a massive two story, semi-circular portico at the front entrance.  It was constructed originally in 1815 as the home of Daniel Ruffner, one of a family which helped develop the early salt industry in the Kanawha Valley. It gained its present-day appearance in about 1902 when new owner, John Nash, undertook substantial remodeling. In 1979, the mansion underwent an extensive rehabilitation when it became headquarters for the West Virginia Commission on Aging.

It was listed on the National Register of Historic Places in 1974.

References

Houses in Charleston, West Virginia
Neoclassical architecture in West Virginia
Federal architecture in West Virginia
Houses completed in 1815
Houses on the National Register of Historic Places in West Virginia
National Register of Historic Places in Charleston, West Virginia
Ruffner family